The Caspian snowcock (Tetraogallus caspius) is a snowcock in the pheasant family Phasianidae of the order Galliformes, gallinaceous birds.

It is found in the mountains of eastern Turkey, Armenia, Azerbaijan and throughout the Alborz Mountains of Northern Iran. It nests in a bare ground scrape and lays 6–9 greenish eggs, which are incubated only by the female. Its diet consists of seeds and vegetable matter. It forms small flocks when not breeding.

Description 
Its plumage is patterned with grey, brown, white and black, but this snowcock looks pale gray from any distance. The breast is pale gray, the throat and a white patch on the side of the neck are white, and the nape is dark gray.

In flight, this wary bird shows white flight feathers and undertail. Male and female plumages are similar, but juveniles are slightly smaller and duller in appearance. There are three races differing in plumage saturation, becoming paler from west to east.

The Caspian snowcock has a desolate whistling song, vaguely like a Eurasian curlew, . It differs from Caucasian snowcock in that it does not have the drop in pitch at the end of the song shown by that species. The calls include loud cackles and bubbled .

References 

 Pheasants, Partridges and Grouse by Madge and McGowan,

External links

Caspian snowcock
Birds of Western Asia
Caspian snowcock